Angelina Vadimovna Lazarenko (born April 13, 1998) is a Russian volleyball player, a member of the Russia women's national volleyball team. Since the 2019/2020 season, she has played for Dinamo Krasnodar.

Sporting achievements

Clubs 
Swiss SuperCup:
  2017
Swiss Cup:
  2018
Swiss Championship:
  2018

National Team 
Youth European Championship:
  2015
Junior European Championship:
  2016
U20 World Championship:
  2017
Summer Universiade:
  2017

Individual
 2015: MVP and the best middle blocker Youth European Championship
 2016: The best middle blocker Junior European Championship

References

External links
 VCMO profile
 VolleyService profile
 VoleroLeCannet profile
 Women.Volleybox profile
 Volleyball.World profile
 CEV profile

1998 births
Living people
Russian women's volleyball players
Russian expatriate sportspeople in Switzerland
Russian expatriate sportspeople in France
Sportspeople from Saratov